Gabrijela is a Croatian given name. It may refer to:

Gabrijela Bartulović (born 1994), Croatian handball player
Gabrijela Skender (born 1999), Croatian cross-country skier
Gabriela Španić  (born 1973), Venezuelan actress

Croatian feminine given names